Cubillas de Arbas or Cubillas de Arbás is a locality and minor local entity located in the municipality of Villamanín, in León province, Castile and León, Spain. As of 2020, it has a population of 60.

Geography 
Cubillas de Arbas is located 71km north-northwest of León, Spain.

References

Populated places in the Province of León